Jan Cornelis "Kees" Douze" (30 March 1939 in Utrecht – 24 February 2011 in Bilthoven) was a sailor from the Netherlands, who represented his native country at the 1972 Summer Olympics in Kiel, Germany. Kees took the 23rd place in the Finn. Later he specialized in the Star, Dutch national classes as well at the 12 foot dinghy. In 1980 Douze returned to the Olympics as substitute helmsman for the Dutch Star.

Controversy
Several countries did boycott the 1980 Summer Olympics, others like France did not go since they found the competition devaluated. As result only half of the expected fleet was present during the Olympic regattas.

Sources
 
 
 
 
 
 
 
 
 
 
 
 
 
 

1939 births
2011 deaths
Dutch male sailors (sport)
Sportspeople from Utrecht (city)
12' Dinghy class sailors
Sailors at the 1972 Summer Olympics – Finn
Olympic sailors of the Netherlands